Nurmio is a Finnish surname. Notable people with the surname include:

Heikki Nurmio (1887–1947), Finnish jäger and writer
Tuomari Nurmio (born 1950), Finnish singer-songwriter
Yrjö Nurmio (1901–1983), Finnish historian and archivist

See also
Nurmi

Finnish-language surnames